John Paul McKeever (born 18 November 1987 in Glasgow), is a Scottish football midfielder who plays for Kirkintilloch Rob Roy.

Career

McKeever started his career with Clyde. He was captain of the Under 19 side, and made his senior debut in a Scottish Challenge Cup match against Stranraer in August 2004, coming on as a late substitute. He only made a handful of appearances after this, and was released in January 2006.

He joined Dumbarton after his release from Clyde, and stayed until May 2007, when he joined junior side Bellshill Athletic. He signed for Kirkintilloch Rob Roy in January 2008.

See also
Clyde F.C. season 2004-05 | 2005-06

References

External links

Living people
Scottish footballers
Clyde F.C. players
Dumbarton F.C. players
Scottish Football League players
1987 births
Kirkintilloch Rob Roy F.C. players
Bellshill Athletic F.C. players
Footballers from Glasgow
Association football midfielders
Scottish Junior Football Association players